Lupton is an unincorporated community and census-designated place (CDP) in Ogemaw County in the U.S. state of Michigan.  At the 2010 census, it had a population of 348.  Lupton is located mostly within Rose Township with a small portion extending south into Cumming Township.

History

Lupton was settled as early as 1880 by several Quaker families from Ohio, including that of Emmor Lupton. The community was first known as Lane Heights and given a post office under the name Lane on April 11, 1881.  A depot on the Detroit, Bay City and Alpena Railroad was opened in January 1893. The post office was renamed Lupton in June 1893.  The post office name changed to Lupton on June 8, 1893.

The Lupton Schoolhouse was constructed from 1903–1904 and served Lupton as the Rose Township District No. 5 School.  The two-room schoolhouse remained in operation until 1963.  The site was dedicated as a Michigan State Historic Site on April 20, 1995. 

The community of Lupton was listed as a newly-organized census-designated place for the 2010 census, meaning it now has officially defined boundaries and population statistics for the first time.

The post office remained in operation until it was discontinued on November 5, 2011.  Although the community contains no post office, the Lupton 48635 ZIP Code remains active is now served by the Rose City post office.

Geography

The Rifle River flows through Lupton, and the Rifle River State Recreation Area is just to the south and use the Lupton ZIP Code.

Demographics

References

Unincorporated communities in Ogemaw County, Michigan
Unincorporated communities in Michigan
Census-designated places in Ogemaw County, Michigan
Census-designated places in Michigan
Populated places established in 1880
1880 establishments in Michigan